The Norwegian Petroleum Museum (Norsk Oljemuseum) is located in Stavanger, Norway.

Overview
It was designed by the architectural firm of Lunde & Løvseth Arkitekter A/S and was opened on 20 May 1999. Seen from the sea the museum looks like a small oil platform.  The unusual architecture has made the museum a landmark in the Port of Stavanger.

The museum was built in stone, glass and concrete and covers approx. 5,000 square meters. The museum focuses on offshore petroleum activity especially in the North Sea. The museum displays objects, films, photographs and other materials have been collected that document Norwegian oil and gas activities. The museum shows the technological development from the beginning of the Norwegian oil history in the mid-1960s, from the first North Sea drilling platforms, through steel and concrete platforms developed and built in Norway, to modern, flexible production ships and subsea systems.

Gallery

See also

 List of petroleum museums

References

External links

Norwegian Petroleum Museum Website
Museums in Stavanger
About the architecture of Norwegian Petroleum Museum
Norwegian Petroleum Museum's page on Norway's official tourism site

History of the petroleum industry in Norway
Industry museums in Norway
Petroleum museums
Museums in Rogaland
Museums in Stavanger
Science museums in Norway
Museums established in 1999
1999 establishments in Norway
P